Somerset Christian Church is a historic Christian church located near Old Somerset, Orange County, Virginia.  It was built about 1850, and is an Italianate style, rectangular wood-frame building  It features a one-story porch of four square Tuscan order columns supporting a pedimented roof.  The interior consists of a single auditorium room with a gallery at the north end.

It was added to the National Register of Historic Places in 1979.

References

Churches on the National Register of Historic Places in Virginia
Italianate architecture in Virginia
Churches completed in 1850
Buildings and structures in Orange County, Virginia
National Register of Historic Places in Orange County, Virginia
Italianate church buildings in the United States